Deathmaker is a 1995 German film directed by Romuald Karmakar and starring Götz George, Jürgen Hentsch and Pierre Franckh. The film is based on the transcripts of the interrogation of the notorious serial killer Fritz Haarmann.

The film received several awards and nominations. The film was awarded the Deutscher Filmpreis Best Feature Film, Deutscher Filmpreis Best Direction and Deutscher Filmpreis Best Actor in 1996. Götz George also won the Volpi Cup at the Venice Film Festival for his role. It was chosen as Germany's official submission to the 69th Academy Awards for Best Foreign Language Film, but did not manage to receive a nomination.

Cast 
 Götz George - Fritz Haarmann
 Jürgen Hentsch - Prof. Dr. Ernst Schultze
 Pierre Franckh - Stenograph
 Hans-Michael Rehberg - Kommissar Rätz
 Matthias Fuchs - Dr. Machnik
 Marek Harloff - Fürsorgezögling Kress

References

External links

See also
 List of submissions to the 69th Academy Awards for Best Foreign Language Film
 List of German submissions for the Academy Award for Best Foreign Language Film

1995 films
1990s biographical films
1995 crime films
Biographical films about serial killers
Films set in the 1920s
German biographical films
German crime films
1990s German-language films
Works about Fritz Haarmann
1990s German films
Films directed by Romuald Karmakar